Rah Shahi (also Romanized as Rāh Shāhī; also known as Rāh-e Shāh) is a village in Khafri Rural District, in the Central District of Sepidan County, Fars Province, Iran. At the 2006 census, its population was 79, in 21 families.

References 

Populated places in Sepidan County